The Upper Midwest Lacrosse Conference (UMLC) is a men's college club lacrosse conference in the Men's Collegiate Lacrosse Association (MCLA). The UMLC includes teams in the midwest in two divisions - nine teams in Division I and six teams in Division II.

The conference was established in 1992 when college teams in Minnesota that were playing a loose schedule of tournament weekends decided to organize into a league that had a specific schedule and end of the season tournament. In 2000, the UMLC was accepted into the US Lacrosse Intercollegiate Associates, which became the MCLA in 2006. In 2003, it was announced that the conference would be split into two divisions for the 2004 season and onwards. The conference was known as the Upper Midwest Lacrosse League until 2011.

UMLC Division II teams have dominated at the MCLA National Championships, winning 9 of the last 11 title games. The University of St. Thomas, the 2019 champion, has won 6 titles since 2009.

Teams

Conference Championships 

 Note: Bold text denotes MCLA National Champion
 Note: Italic text denotes MCLA National Champion runner-up

 Note: Bold text denotes MCLA National Champion
 Note: Italic text denotes MCLA National Champion runner-up

References

External links
Website

College lacrosse leagues in the United States